Ficus benguetensis (called 豬母乳 in Taiwan) is a shrub or tree of the family Moraceae living at low altitudes in the Ryu Kyu Islands, Taiwan and in the Philippines but not in Palawan.
It lives as an understorey tree in humid forest environment and along streams and rivers.

Taxonomy
Ficus benguetensis was described by the American botanist Elmer Drew Merrill in 1905. Within the genus, Ficus benguetensis belongs to the subgenus Sycomorus section Sycocarpus subsection Sycocarpus.

Description
Tree or shrub up to 15 meters. New leaves are characteristically reddish or orange before reaching maturation. Leaves are symmetric, elliptic to oblong.  Figs grow often from stipules on growing from the trunk of male trees but grow by pairs on apical branches on female trees. Figs are subglobose to ellipsoid or ovoid, the apex is flat or concave. The figs are green but the inside of the figs is pink to reddish pink. At maturity, the figs became yellowish green.

Habitat
Ficus benguetensis trees live up to 1800m in humid and closed forests often along streams and small rivers.

Ecology
Ficus benguetensis is pollinated by fig wasps from the genus Ceratosolen and dispersed by birds and fruit bats. In a single area south of Taipei, up to 13 different species of ants have been found on Ficus benguetensis figs. Moreover, this is the first species of Ficus which have extrafloral nectaries directly on the figs.
Two species of parasitic nonpollinating fig wasps have been recently described from Ficus benguetensis: Philotrypesis taida and Sycorycteridea taipeiensis.

References

benguetensis
Flora of the Philippines
Flora of Malesia
Flora of Taiwan
Dioecious plants